Deoli Union is a union parishad under Delduar Upazila of Tangail District in the Dhaka Division of central Bangladesh.

Demographics

According to Population Census 2011 performed by Bangladesh Bureau of Statistics, The total population of Deoli union is 16718. There are 3944 households in total.

Education

The literacy rate of Deoli Union is 50.2% (Male-52.6%, Female-48%).

See also
 Union Councils of Tangail District

References

Populated places in Dhaka Division
Populated places in Tangail District
Unions of Delduar Upazila